Nehemiah Mote (born 21 June 1993) is an Australian volleyball player. Nehemiah was offered an AIS (Australian Institute of Sport) scholarship in 2013 after a three-month trial, and represented NSW at the Australian Junior Volleyball Championships. He was selected to represent Australia for the first time in the Under 23's Junior World Championships in Brazil. He previously played for TV Bühl and Berlin Recycling Volleys in Germany and Volley Amriswil in Switzerland. Mote currently plays for VfB Friedrichshafen.

He represented Australia at the 2014 FIVB Volleyball Men's World Championship in Poland. His father represented Samoa in Volleyball.

References

Australian men's volleyball players
Living people
1993 births